1981 in sports describes the year's events in world sport.

Alpine skiing
 Alpine Skiing World Cup –
 Men's overall season champion: Phil Mahre, USA
 Women's overall season champion: Marie-Theres Nadig,  Switzerland

American football
 January 25 – Super Bowl XV: the Oakland Raiders (AFC) won 27−10 over the Philadelphia Eagles (NFC)
 Location: Superdome
 Attendance: 76,135	
 MVP: Jim Plunkett, QB (Oakland)
 Sugar Bowl (1980 season):
 The Georgia Bulldogs won 17-10 over the  Notre Dame Fighting Irish to win the college football national championship
 October 11 - LeRoy Irvin sets NFL record for most punt return yards in a game (207).

Artistic gymnastics
 World Artistic Gymnastics Championships –
 Men's all-around champion: Yuri Korolev, USSR
 Women's all-around champion: Olga Bicherova, USSR
 Men's team competition champion: USSR
 Women's team competition champion: USSR

Association football
 UEFA Champions League – Liverpool FC 1-0 Real Madrid
 UEFA Cup – two leg final: 1st leg Ipswich Town F.C. 3-0 AZ '67 (Alkmaar); 2nd leg AZ '67 4-2 Ipswich Town. Ipswich Town win 5-4 on aggregate
 Cup Winners' Cup – Dynamo Tbilisi 2-1 Carl Zeiss Jena
 Copa Libertadores de América – Flamengo 2-0 Cobreloa
 World Club Championship – Flamengo 3-0 Liverpool FC
 Aston Villa win English League Championship
 FA Cup – Tottenham Hotspur win 3-2 over Manchester City

Australian rules football
 Victorian Football League
 May 23 – A protest by Richmond against the eligibility of defender Doug Cox to play for St. Kilda led to the Saints temporarily losing the points for their first two wins. They were reinstated later due to changes in the relevant rules, but a fine of $5000 remained.
 June 6 – ’s Kevin Bartlett became the first to play 350 VFL games.
 Carlton win the 85th VFL Premiership, beating Collingwood 12.20 (92) to 10.12 (72)
 Brownlow Medal awarded to Barry Round (South Melbourne) and Bernie Quinlan (Fitzroy)
 At the end of the season, South Melbourne relocate to Sydney and are renamed the Sydney Swans.

Baseball
 For a Venezuelans baseball player's strike the Caribbean World Series of this year is cancelled.
 January 15 - In his first year of eligibility, former Cardinals pitcher Bob Gibson is the only player elected to the Baseball Hall of Fame. Gibson won 20 games five times, struck out 3,117 batters, and captured the Cy Young Award and MVP in 1968 with a 1.12 ERA. Players falling short of the 301 votes needed for election include Don Drysdale (243), Gil Hodges (241), Harmon Killebrew (239), Hoyt Wilhelm (238), and Juan Marichal (233). All except Hodges would subsequently gain election.
 April 18 - An International League game between the Pawtucket Red Sox and the visiting Rochester Red Wings set the record for the most innings ever played in a single professional baseball game, at 33 innings (24 extra innings). The game was suspended after 32 innings on the morning of April 19, and was concluded on June 23 with a 3-2 Pawtucket victory.
 June 12 - Major League Baseball players begin a 49-day strike over the issue of free-agent compensation.
 World Series – Los Angeles Dodgers win 4 games to 2 over the New York Yankees. The Series MVP is a tie between Ron Cey, Pedro Guerrero and Steve Yeager, Los Angeles

Basketball
 NCAA Men's Division I Basketball Championship –
 Indiana wins 63-50 over North Carolina
 NBA Finals –
 Boston Celtics won 4 games to 2 over the Houston Rockets
 National Basketball League (Australia) Finals:
 Launceston Casino City defeated the Nunawading Spectres 75-54 in the final.

Boxing
 April 11 – Larry Holmes defeats Trevor Berbick by a unanimous decision to retain the WBC heavyweight title.
 August 21 – Salvador Sánchez defeats Wilfredo Gómez by knockout in round eight to retain boxing's WBC world Featherweight title.(see: The Battle of the Little Giants)
 September 16 – Sugar Ray Leonard defeats Thomas Hearns by knockout in round 14 to unify boxing's world Welterweight title.
 October 3 – Mike Weaver defeats James (Quick) Tillis by a unanimous decision to retain the WBA heavyweight title. Marvin Hagler defeats Mustafa Hamsho by eleventh-round technical knockout to retain his undisputed world Middleweight title as Weaver-Tillis' show's main event.

Canadian football
 Grey Cup – Edmonton Eskimos win 26–23 over the Ottawa Rough Riders
 Vanier Cup – Acadia Axemen win 18–12 over the Alberta Golden Bears

Cycling
 Giro d'Italia won by Giovanni Battaglin of Italy
 Tour de France won by Bernard Hinault of France

Dogsled racing
 Iditarod Trail Sled Dog Race Champion –
 Rick Swenson won with lead dogs: Andy & Slick

Field hockey
 Men's Champions Trophy held in Karachi won by the Netherlands
 Women's World Cup held in Buenos Aires won by West Germany

Figure skating
 World Figure Skating Championship –
 Men's champion: Scott Hamilton, United States
 Ladies' champion: Denise Biellmann, Switzerland
 Pair skating champions: Irina Vorobeva & Igor Lisovski, Soviet Union
 Ice dancing champions: Jayne Torvill & Christopher Dean, Great Britain

Gaelic Athletic Association
Camogie
 All-Ireland Camogie Champion: Kilkenny
 National Camogie League: Dublin
Gaelic football
 All-Ireland Senior Football Championship – Kerry 1-12 died Offaly 0-8
 National Football League – Galway 1-11 died Roscommon 1-3
Ladies' Gaelic football
 All-Ireland Senior Football Champion: Kerry 1-12 died Offaly 0-8
 National Football League: Galway 1-11 died Roscommon 1-3
Hurling
 All-Ireland Senior Hurling Championship – Offaly 2-12 died Galway 0-15
 National Hurling League – Cork 3-11 died Offaly 2-8

Golf
Men's professional
 Masters Tournament - Tom Watson
 U.S. Open - David Graham
 British Open - Bill Rogers
 PGA Championship - Larry Nelson
 PGA Tour money leader - Tom Kite - $375,699
 Senior PGA Tour money leader - Miller Barber - $83,136
 Ryder Cup - United States win 18½ to 9½ over Europe in team golf.
Men's amateur
 British Amateur - Philippe Ploujoux
 U.S. Amateur - Nathaniel Crosby
Women's professional
 LPGA Championship - Donna Caponi
 U.S. Women's Open - Pat Bradley
 Classique Peter Jackson Classic - Jan Stephenson
 LPGA Tour money leader - Beth Daniel - $206,998

Harness racing
 United States Pacing Triple Crown races –
 Cane Pace - Wildwood Jeb
 Little Brown Jug - Fan Hanover (Filly)
 Messenger Stakes - Seahawk Hanover
 United States Trotting Triple Crown races –
 Hambletonian - Shiaway St. Pat
 Yonkers Trot - Mo Bandy
 Kentucky Futurity - Filet of Sole
 Australian Inter Dominion Harness Racing Championship –
Pacers: San Simeon

Horse racing
 August 30 – John Henry becomes the first horse to win a million dollar race, the inaugural Arlington Million, at Arlington Park in the Chicago suburb of Arlington Heights, Illinois.
 November – inaugural running of the Japan Cup, the most prestigious horse race in Japan, at Tokyo Racecourse in Fuchu, Tokyo.  Its distance is about 1½ miles on turf and it is the world's richest turf race.
Steeplechases
 Cheltenham Gold Cup – Little Owl
 Grand National – Aldaniti
Flat races
 Australia – Melbourne Cup won by Just A Dash
 Canada – Queen's Plate won by Fiddle Dancer Boy
 France – 1981 Prix de l'Arc de Triomphe won by Gold River
 Ireland – Irish Derby Stakes won by Shergar
 Japan – Japan Cup won by Mairzy Doates
 English Triple Crown Races:
 2,000 Guineas Stakes – To-Agori-Mou
 The Derby – Shergar
 St. Leger Stakes – Cut Above
 United States Triple Crown Races:
 Kentucky Derby – Pleasant Colony
 Preakness Stakes – Pleasant Colony
 Belmont Stakes – Summing
Quarter Horse Racing
 Triple Crown of Quarter Horse Racing
 Special Effort

Ice hockey
 May 10 - Cornwall Royals defeat the Kitchener Rangers to win the 1981 Memorial Cup
 May 21 - New York Islanders defeat the Minnesota North Stars to win the 1981 Stanley Cup
 Ice Hockey World Championships:
 Men's champion: Soviet Union defeated Sweden
 Junior Men's champion: Sweden defeated Finland
 August 27 – death of Valeri Kharlamov (33), Russian player, in a car crash

Motorsport

Rugby league
1981 European Rugby League Championship
1981 New Zealand rugby league season
1981 NSWRFL season
1981 Craven Mild Cup
1981 Tooth Cup
1980–81 Rugby Football League season/1981–82 Rugby Football League season
1981 State of Origin game

Rugby union
 87th Five Nations Championship series is won by France who complete the Grand Slam
 The 1981 Springbok Tour causes major controversy and riots in New Zealand

Snooker
 World Snooker Championship – Steve Davis beats Doug Mountjoy 18-12
 World rankings – Cliff Thorburn becomes world number one for 1981/82

Swimming
 August 15 – USA's Robin Leamy of UCLA sets a world record time of 22.54 in the 50m freestyle (long course) at Brown Deer, Wisconsin, shaving 0.17 off the previous record (22.71) set by Joseph Bottom exactly one year ago in Honolulu, Hawaii

Tennis
 Grand Slam in tennis men's results:
 Australian Open - Johan Kriek
 French Open - Björn Borg
 Wimbledon championships - John McEnroe
 U.S. Open - John McEnroe
 Grand Slam in tennis women's results:
 Australian Open - Martina Navratilova
 French Open - Hana Mandlíková
 Wimbledon championships - Chris Evert
 U.S. Open - Tracy Austin
 Davis Cup – United States wins 3-1 over Argentina in world tennis.

Volleyball
 Men and Women's European Volleyball Championships held in Bulgaria and won by USSR (men) and Bulgaria (women)

Water polo
 1981 FINA Men's Water Polo World Cup in Long Beach, California won by USSR
 1981 FINA Women's Water Polo World Cup in Brisbane, Australia won by Canada

Multi-sport events
 First World Games held in Santa Clara, United States
 Eleventh Summer Universiade held in Bucharest, Romania
 Tenth Winter Universiade held in Jaca, Spain

Awards
 Associated Press Male Athlete of the Year – John McEnroe, Tennis
 Associated Press Female Athlete of the Year – Tracy Austin, Tennis
 Sports Illustrated Sportsman of the Year - Sugar Ray Leonard, Boxing

References

 
Sports by year